Euxoa bifasciata is a species of cutworm or dart moth in the family Noctuidae. It is found in North America.

The MONA or Hodges number for Euxoa bifasciata is 10796.

Subspecies
These three subspecies belong to the species Euxoa bifasciata:
 Euxoa bifasciata bifasciata
 Euxoa bifasciata bisagittifera Benjamin
 Euxoa bifasciata lowensis Benjamin

References

Further reading

 
 
 

Euxoa
Articles created by Qbugbot
Moths described in 1888